was the 61st emperor of Japan, according to the traditional order of succession.

Suzaku's reign spanned the years from 930 through 946.

Biography
Before his ascension of the Chrysanthemum Throne, his personal name (imina) was Hiroakira-shinnō.

Hiroakira-shinnō was the 11th son of Emperor Daigo and Empress Consort Onshi, a daughter of the regent and great minister of the council of state, Fujiwara no Mototsune.

Suzaku had two Empresses or consorts and one Imperial daughter.

Events of Suzaku's life
Suzaku's older brother died unexpectedly young, as did his brother's son. These untimely deaths opened the way for Suzaku to accede to the throne.

 October 16, 930 (Enchō 8, 22nd day of the 9th month):  In the 33rd year of the reign of Daigo-tennō (醍醐天皇三十三年), the emperor abdicated; and the succession (the senso) was received by his eleventh son, Hiroakira-shinnō (also known as Yutaakira-shinnō).
 December 14, 930 (Enchō 8, 22nd day of the 11th month): Emperor Suzaku, who was only 8 years old, acceded to the throne (the sokui).
 May 16, 931 (Enchō 9, 26th day of the 4th month): The era name was changed to mark the beginning of the new emperor's reign.
 August 5, 931 (Jōhei 1, 19th day of the 7th month): The former-Emperor Uda (867–931) died at the age of 65.
 932 (Jōhei 2, 8th month): The udaijin (Minister of the Right) Fujiwara no Sadakata (873–932) died at the age of 65.
 933 (Jōhei 3, 8th month): The dainagon (Counselor) Fujiwara no Nakahira is named udaijin. Nakahira is the brother of sesshō (regent) Fujiwara Tadahira.
 933 (Jōhei 3, 12th month): Ten of the chief dignitaries of the empire went falcon-hunting together in Owari Province. Each of them was magnificent in his formal hunting attire.
 935 (Jōhei 5): The Great Fundamental Central Hall (kompon chūdō) on Mt. Hiei burned down.
 September 7, 936 (Jōhei 6, 19th day of the 8th month): Fujiwara no Tadahira was named daijō-daijin (Prime Minister); and in this same period, Fujiwara no Nakahira was named sadaijin (Minister of the Left), and Fujiwara no Tsunesuke was named udaijin.
 937 (Jōhei 7, 12th month): The former-Emperor Yōzei celebrated his 70th birthday.
 938 (Jōhei 8, 4th month):  Serial intermittent ground-tremors were felt in Heian-kyō from the 10th through the 29th days of this month.
 940 (Tengyō 3): During his reign Taira no Masakado raised a great insurrection in the Kantō region and declared himself the "New Emperor" (新皇), but his forces were defeated by Fujiwara no Hidesato and Taira no Sadamori, and he was decapitated.
 941 (Tengyō 4): Fujiwara no Sumitomo staged a rebellion, having made a secret agreement with Taira no Masakado, but his army was defeated by Tachibana Tōyasu.
 May 23, 946 (Tengyō 9, 20th day of the 4th month): Suzaku abdicates, having ruled for 16 years.  The emperor was succeeded by his younger brother, who would become Emperor Murakami.
 952 (Tenryaku 6): Suzaku took ordination as a Buddhist monk at Ninna-ji.
 September 6, 952 (Tenryaku 6, 15th day of the 8th month): Suzaku died at the age of 30.

The actual site of Suzaku's grave is known.  This emperor is traditionally venerated at a memorial Shinto shrine (misasagi) at Kyoto.

The Imperial Household Agency designates this location as Suzaku's mausoleum. It is formally named Daigo no misasagi in Fushimi-ku, Kyoto near the Buddhist temple, Daigo-ji.

Kugyō
 is a collective term for the very few most powerful men attached to the court of the Emperor of Japan in pre-Meiji eras.

In general, this elite group included only three to four men at a time.  These were hereditary courtiers whose experience and background have brought them to the pinnacle of a life's career.  During Suzaku's reign, this apex of the Daijō-kan included: 
 Sesshō, Fujiwara no Tadahira, 880–949.
 Kampaku, Fujiwara no Tadahira.
 Daijō-daijin, Fujiwara no Tadahira.
 Sadaijin, Fujiwara no Tadahira .
 Sadaijin, Fujiwara no Nakahira.
 Udaijin, Fujiwara no Sadakata　 (藤原定方).
 Udaijin, Fujiwara no Nakahira.
 Udaijin, Fujiwara no Tsunesuke 　(藤原恒佐).
 Udaijin, Fujiwara no Saneyori, 900–970.
 Naidaijin
 Dainagon, Fujiwara no Nakahira.

Eras of Suzaku's reign

The years of Suzaku's reign are more specifically identified by more than one era name or nengō.
 Enchō   (923–931)
 Jōhei   (931–938)
 Tengyō (938–947)

Consorts and children
Consort (Nyōgo): Princess Hiroko/Kishi (熙子女王; d. 950), Imperial crown Prince Yasuakira's daughter (Emperor Daigo’s son)
First Daughter: Imperial Princess Masako later Kanon'in taigō (観音院太后), married Emperor Reizei

Consort (Nyōgo): Fujiwara no Yoshiko (藤原慶子; d. 951), Fujiwara no Saneyori's daughter

Ancestry

Notes

References
 Brown, Delmer M. and Ichirō Ishida, eds. (1979).  Gukanshō: The Future and the Past. Berkeley: University of California Press. ;  OCLC 251325323
 Ponsonby-Fane, Richard Arthur Brabazon. (1959).  The Imperial House of Japan. Kyoto: Ponsonby Memorial Society. OCLC 194887
 Titsingh, Isaac. (1834). Nihon Ōdai Ichiran; ou,  Annales des empereurs du Japon.  Paris: Royal Asiatic Society, Oriental Translation Fund of Great Britain and Ireland.  OCLC 5850691
 Varley, H. Paul. (1980).  Jinnō Shōtōki: A Chronicle of Gods and Sovereigns. New York: Columbia University Press. ;  OCLC 59145842

See also
 Emperor of Japan
 List of Emperors of Japan
 Imperial cult
 Emperor Go-Suzaku

Japanese emperors
921 births
952 deaths
People of Heian-period Japan
10th-century Japanese monarchs
Heian period Buddhist clergy
Shingon Buddhist monks
Japanese Buddhist monarchs
Japanese retired emperors
People from Kyoto